The discography of English boy band Five consists of four studio albums, four compilation albums, eighteen singles, fourteen music videos and three video albums. Five's debut album, 5ive, was released by RCA Records in the United Kingdom in June 1998 and peaked at number one on the UK Albums Chart and has been certified double platinum by the British Phonographic Industry (BPI). The first single from the album, "Slam Dunk (Da Funk)", peaked at number ten on the UK Singles Chart and within the top thirty across most of Europe. Follow-up single, "When the Lights Go Out", was more successful, peaking at number four in the UK, number two in Australia and number ten on the Billboard Hot 100 in the United States. Other singles released from the album, "Got the Feelin'", "Everybody Get Up", and "Until the Time Is Through" all peaked within the top three in the UK and Ireland, and all three have been certified silver by the BPI.

In November 1999, Five released their second album, Invincible, which reached number four in the UK and was certified two times platinum by the BPI. The first single, "If Ya Gettin' Down", became their third in a row to peak at number two in the UK. This was followed by their first UK number-one single, "Keep on Movin'". "Don't Wanna Let You Go" came next and peaked at nine in the UK. In March 2000, Five opened at the BRIT Awards with rock legends Queen, performing an updated version of that Queen's hit, "We Will Rock You" which was later released as a single and it became their second UK number one in July 2000. Third album Kingsize came in August 2001 and contained "Let's Dance", which became Five's third UK number-one single. The album later peaked at number three. The band decided to disband a few weeks later on 27 September 2001. The band's final single, "Closer to Me", was released as a double a-side with "Rock the Party" in the UK and Ireland and reached numbers four and twelve respectively. A Greatest Hits album followed in November.

In September 2006, it was announced the four of the original Five members, without Sean Conlon, would be reforming and they started recording material for the band's fourth album and also planned a tour for summer 2007. However, on 19 May 2007, only eight months after reforming, having failed to secure a lucrative enough record deal, Five announced via their official website that they will no longer be pursuing a comeback. In 2012, it was announced that Five would again be reforming, this time with Conlon, but without J Brown who later pulled out of the reunion and in August 2014, Abz Love left the band due to creative differences.

In 2021, Five confirmed the release of their first album in 20 years Time, which was released on 28 January the following year.

Albums

Studio albums

Compilation albums

Video albums

Singles

As main artist

As featured artist

Promotional singles

Music videos

Notes

References

Discographies of British artists
Pop music group discographies
Five (band)